British rock band Coldplay have released 64 music videos, five video albums and five films, appearing on multiple television shows throughout their career as well. They were formed in London by Chris Martin (lead vocals, piano), Jonny Buckland (guitar), Guy Berryman (bass guitar), Will Champion (drums, percussion) and Phil Harvey (creative direction). Before the band signed a record deal with Parlophone in 1999, a music video for "Bigger Stronger" was shot and directed by Mat Whitecross, who later became one of their long-time collaborators. It was followed by the singles "Shiver", "Yellow", "Trouble" and "Don't Panic" from Parachutes (2000), with the third receiving a MTV Video Music Award for Best Art Direction.

To promote A Rush of Blood to the Head (2002), Coldplay released "In My Place" and "The Scientist"; the latter was nominated for Best Short Form Music Video at the 46th Annual Grammy Awards and earned three MTV Video Music Awards. The marketing campaign was completed in the following year with "Clocks", "God Put a Smile upon Your Face" and Live 2003, their first video album. Released in June 2005, X&Y spawned four singles: "Speed of Sound", "Fix You", "Talk" and "The Hardest Part". They were succeeded by "Violet Hill" in May 2008 in anticipation for their fourth album, Viva la Vida or Death and All His Friends.

In August 2008, the band made two versions of "Viva la Vida" available: the first consists of Coldplay performing the track, while the second is a tribute to Depeche Mode's "Enjoy the Silence". To further promote the record, they also released music videos for "Lovers in Japan", "Lost!", "Life in Technicolor II" and "Strawberry Swing", which received three UK Music Video Awards. In 2010, "Christmas Lights" was launched as a holiday single. Music videos for "Every Teardrop Is a Waterfall", "Paradise" and "Charlie Brown" were then directed by Whitecross for Mylo Xyloto (2011). The record spawned "Princess of China" and "Hurts Like Heaven" as well, having its promotion completed by a worldwide theatrical release of the band's second video album, Live 2012. For Ghost Stories (2014), Coldplay released five music videos: "Midnight", "Magic", "A Sky Full of Stars", "True Love" and "Ink", the latter was an interactive project inspired by Choose Your Own Adventure (1979), which had its final version based on the choices most picked by fans. Later that year, they released Ghost Stories Live 2014. Its exclusive bonus content for physical editions included the visuals for "All Your Friends", "Always in My Head" and "Ghost Story".

In 2015, the band launched "Adventure of a Lifetime" as the lead single for A Head Full of Dreams, following it with music videos for "Birds", "Hymn for the Weekend" and "Up&Up" in the next year. The latter earned two D&AD Awards and two silver prizes at the Cannes Lions International Festival of Creativity. The record's marketing campaign was then finished with "A Head Full of Dreams" and "Everglow". In 2018, they released The Butterfly Package, a set with their fifth live (Live in Buenos Aires) and video (Live in São Paulo) albums plus a documentary directed by Whitecross (Coldplay: A Head Full of Dreams). A year later, Everyday Life (2019) produced six new music videos, including "Orphans" and "Daddy", which won a MTV Video Music Award and two silver prizes at the Clio Awards, respectively. The band also performed the album at the Amman Citadel in Jordan and broadcast the show on YouTube. Between 2021 and 2022, Dave Meyers directed "Higher Power", "My Universe" and "Let Somebody Go" for Music of the Spheres.

Music videos

Video albums

Television appearances

Films

Advertisements

See also
 Coldplay discography
 List of songs recorded by Coldplay

Notes

References

External links
 Coldplay Official Website
 Coldplay on AllMusic

Videography
British filmographies
Videographies of British artists